The 2011–12 season is the 115th season of competitive football in Scotland.

Overview
To be announced

Transfer deals

League competitions

Scottish Premier League

Scottish First Division

Scottish Second Division

Scottish Third Division

Scottish Premier Under-19 League

Honours

Cup honours

Non-league honours

Senior

Junior
West Region

East Region

North Region

Individual honours

PFA Scotland awards

SFWA awards

Scottish clubs in Europe

Summary

 Current UEFA coefficients: Ranking (No. 25)
Celtic were reinstated taking Sion's place in Group I as the Swiss side fielded ineligible players during their tie. Celtic were awarded both of the matches as a 3–0 forfeit, resulting in a boost to their coefficient from 0.5 to 2.0.

Rangers
2011–12 UEFA Champions League

2011–12 UEFA Europa League

Celtic
2011–12 UEFA Europa League

Sion defeated Celtic in the initial two-legged tie by an aggregate score of 3–1. Celtic had played both games under protest to UEFA after Sion fielded five ineligible players over the two games. Sion were forced to forfeit both ties against Celtic after UEFA found them guilty of the charge, with UEFA awarding Celtic 3–0 wins in both legs.

Heart of Midlothian
2011–12 UEFA Europa League

Dundee United
2011–12 UEFA Europa League

National teams

Scotland national team

Scotland Under-21 team

Women's football

League and Cup honours

Individual honours

SWF awards

Scotland women's national team

Glasgow City
2011–12 UEFA Women's Champions League

Deaths
1 July: Willie Fernie, 82, Celtic and Scotland forward; Kilmarnock manager.
31 July: Willie Corbett, 88, Celtic, Dunfermline and Morton defender.
16 August: Frank Munro, 63, Dundee United, Aberdeen, Celtic and Scotland defender.
27 August: John Parke, 74, Hibs defender.
28 August: Bernie Gallacher, 44, Aston Villa defender.
 7 September: Derek Grierson, 79, Queen's Park, Rangers and Falkirk forward.
 20 November: David Cargill, 75, Arbroath winger.
 6 December: Lawrie Tierney, 52, Hearts and Hibs midfielder.
 9 January: Bill Dickie, 82, Motherwell director; Scottish Football Association president.
 14 February: Tom McAnearney, 79, Sheffield Wednesday player.
 28 April: Tom Spence, 50, Stirling Albion defender; Albion Rovers manager.
 4 June: Bobby Black, 85, East Fife and Queen of the South winger.
 22 June: Jackie Neilson, 83, St Mirren wing half.

References

 
Seasons in Scottish football